U Street or "U" Street is the 22nd of a sequence of alphabetical streets in many cities (or the 21st if "I" or "J" is omitted).

It may refer to:
 U Street (Washington, D.C.), a street in Washington, D.C.
 U Street (Washington, D.C.), commercial and residential district in northwest Washington, D.C.
 U Street (WMATA station), a Metro station in Washington, D.C. on the Green and Yellow lines

See also
 School of Hard Knocks or "University of the Streets"
 University/65th Street, a station in Sacramento, California
 Street University, a project of the Ted Noffs Foundation in New South Wales, Australia

 Avenue U (disambiguation)
 University Avenue (disambiguation)
 University Street (disambiguation)